The 2011 Australian Open was a tennis tournament held at Melbourne Park in Melbourne, Australia from 17 January to 30 January 2011. It was the 99th edition of the Australian Open and the first Grand Slam event of 2011. The tournament was played on hard courts and was organised by the International Tennis Federation and Tennis Australia. 

The women's singles competition was won by Kim Clijsters, and the men's singles by Novak Djokovic.



Day 1 (17 January) 

 Seeds out:
 Men's Singles:  Sam Querrey,  Nikolay Davydenko
 Women's Singles:  Aravane Rezaï,  Daniela Hantuchová
Schedule of Play

Day 2 (18 January) 
The second day saw both Nadal and Murray win when their opponents retired. There was also a win for wildcard Bernard Tomic whilst Baghdatis had to go to five sets before sealing victory, while Del Potro came through his first Grand Slam match since injury in straight sets. Both Tsonga and Verdasco came from two sets down to move into the next round. On the women's side both Molik and Radwańska won marathon final sets to advance into the second round. There was also a win for home hope Sam Stosur and world number two Vera Zvonerva. While the 2008 finalist Ana Ivanovic crashed out 10–8 in the final set.

In the evening matches on Rod Laver could not have been more different. The first match was a battle between two former number ones, Kim Clijsters and Dinara Safina. Clijsters did not lose a game in the forty five minutes they spent on court. The men's evening match on Laver was a repeat of the 2002 Wimbledon final between home hope Lleyton Hewitt and Argentine David Nalbandian. The pair traded breaks and shared the first four sets. Nalbandian got an early break in the deciding set. At 5–4 the Argentine served for the match, and Hewitt just as he did in the fourth set broke Nalbandian as he served for the set. At 5–6 Hewitt had two match points which Nalbandian saved, only for the Argentine to force Hewitt to save break points in the next game. At seven all the Argentine broke to love and held on to serve the match out for a 3–6 6–4 3–6 7–6(1) 9–7, win at seven minutes past one in the morning after close to a five hours battle.
 Seeds Out:
 Men's Singles:  Ernests Gulbis
 Women's Singles:  Ana Ivanovic,  Alexandra Dulgheru,
Schedule of Play

Day 3 (19 January) 
 Seeds out:
 Men's Singles:  Mardy Fish,  Albert Montañés,  Juan Mónaco
 Women's Singles:  Marion Bartoli,  Kaia Kanepi,  Yanina Wickmayer,  Tsvetana Pironkova
Schedule of Play

Day 4 (20 January) 
 Seeds out:
 Men's Singles:  Michaël Llodra,  David Nalbandian,  Thomaz Bellucci,  Feliciano López
 Women's Singles:  Jelena Janković,  Maria Kirilenko,  Alisa Kleybanova,  María José Martínez Sánchez
Schedule of Play

Day 5 (21 January) 

 Seeds out:
 Men's Singles:  Gaël Monfils,  Ivan Ljubičić,  Richard Gasquet,  Viktor Troicki
 Women's Singles:  Venus Williams,  Justine Henin,  Dominika Cibulková
Schedule of Play

Day 6 (22 January) 

 Seeds out:
 Men's Singles:  Mikhail Youzhny,  Jo-Wilfried Tsonga,  John Isner,  Marcos Baghdatis,  Guillermo García-López
 Women's Singles:  Samantha Stosur,  Shahar Pe'er,  Nadia Petrova,  Anastasia Pavlyuchenkova,  Lucie Šafářová
Schedule of Play

Day 7 (23 January) 
History was created in the match between Kuznetsova and Schiavone. The match became the longest match, in terms of time for women in a Grand Slam as it lasted for 4 hours, and 44 minutes. At 8–7 in the final set Kutznetsova had three match points, but the Italian saved all three. In the next game Schiavone broke her opponents serve but touched the net after hitting the winner, meaning the point went to Kutznetsova, when holding three break points. Kutznetsova had another three match points in the next game before a run of four games in a row where the serve was broken. Finally after breaking in the previous game and missing three match points Schiavone closed the match out to win 16–14 in the final set.
 Seeds out:
 Men's Singles:  Andy Roddick [8],  Fernando Verdasco [9],  Nicolás Almagro [14]
 Women's Singles:  Victoria Azarenka [8],  Maria Sharapova [14],  Svetlana Kuznetsova [23]
Schedule of Play

Day 8 (24 January) 

 Seeds out:
 Men's Singles:  Robin Söderling,  Jürgen Melzer,  Marin Čilić
 Women's Singles:  Flavia Pennetta
Schedule of Play

Day 9 (25 January) 

 Seeds out:
 Men's Singles:  Tomáš Berdych,  Stanislas Wawrinka
 Women's Singles:  Francesca Schiavone,  Andrea Petkovic
Schedule of Play

Day 10 (26 January) 
Australia Day witnessed the last four quarterfinals in the men's and women's singles and the start of the wheelchair tennis competitions. In the first of the men's quarterfinals Murray over came Dolgopolov after a four set battle.
 Seeds out:
 Men's Singles:  Rafael Nadal
 Women's Singles:  Agnieszka Radwańska,  Petra Kvitová
Schedule of Play

Day 11 (27 January) 

 Seeds out:
 Men's Singles:  Roger Federer
 Women's Singles:  Caroline Wozniacki,  Vera Zvonareva
Schedule of Play

Day 12 (28 January) 

 Seeds out:
 Men's Singles:  David Ferrer
Schedule of Play

Day 13 (29 January) 

 Seeds out:
 Women's Singles:  Li Na
Schedule of Play

Day 14 (30 January) 

 Seeds out:
 Men's Singles:  Andy Murray
Schedule of Play

References

Day-by-day summaries
Australian Open (tennis) by year – Day-by-day summaries